Asclepias exaltata (poke milkweed or tall milkweed) is a species of flowering plant in the dogbane family, native to eastern North America.

It blooms from late spring to early summer. The flowers are green and white.

Poke milkweed is found in moist woodland habitats, shores, and woodland edges. It grows in moist soil and sunny or partly shaded places.

References

External links
 
 

exaltata
Flora of North America
Plants described in 1753
Taxa named by Carl Linnaeus